The Division of Berowra is an Australian electoral division in the state of New South Wales. The Division covers the Northern Parts of the Greater Sydney area with the local government areas of the Hornsby Shire and the Hills Shire.

Geography
Since 1984, federal electoral division boundaries in Australia have been determined at redistributions by a redistribution committee appointed by the Australian Electoral Commission. Redistributions occur for the boundaries of divisions in a particular state, and they occur every seven years, or sooner if a state's representation entitlement changes or when divisions of a state are malapportioned.

History

The division was created in 1969 and is named for the suburb of Berowra.

Its boundaries have changed little since it was created, and it includes the suburbs of Annangrove, Arcadia, Berowra, Berowra Creek, Berowra Heights, Berowra Waters, Berrilee, Brooklyn, Canoelands, Cheltenham, Cherrybrook, Cowan, Dangar Island, Dural, Fiddletown, Fishermans Point, Forest Glen, Galston, Glenorie, Hawkesbury River, Hornsby Heights, Kenthurst, Laughtondale, Maroota, Middle Dural, Milsons Passage, Mount Kuring-gai, Pennant Hills, Round Corner, Sackville North, Singletons Mill, South Maroota, Thornleigh, and Westleigh; as well as parts of Asquith, Beecroft, Carlingford, Castle Hill, Cattai, Glenhaven, Hornsby, Leets Vale, Lower Hawkesbury, Lower Portland, Maraylya, Mount Colah, Normanhurst, West Pennant Hills, and Wisemans Ferry.

The seat has always been viewed as a safe seat for the Liberal Party, but has become slightly more marginal in 2022.

Members

Election results

References

External links
 Division of Berowra - Australian Electoral Commission

Electoral divisions of Australia
Constituencies established in 1969
1969 establishments in Australia